Minho or Miño may refer to:

People
 Miño (surname)
 Choi Min-ho, K-Pop star known mononymously as Minho

Places
 Minho (river) or Miño, in Portugal and Spain

Jamaica
 Rio Minho, a river

Portugal
 Minho Province, a historical province (1936-1976)
 Minho VR, a wine region

Spain
 Miño, A Coruña, a municipality in the province of A Coruña, Galicia
 Miño de Medinaceli, a municipality in the province of Soria, Castile and León
 Miño (Tineo), a parish (administrative division) in Tineo, a municipality within the province and autonomous community of Asturias

Other uses
 Miño Volcano, El Loa Province, Antofagasta Region, Chile
 Minho, one of the main characters from The Maze Runner series; a runner

See also
 Min-ho, Korean masculine given name
 Choi Min-ho, member of the South Korean boy group Shinee
 Mino (disambiguation)